Andrea Stock (born 28 November 1980 in Caracas, Venezuela) is a former German curler.

She is a former European champion and competed at the 2002 Winter Olympics, finishing in 5th place.

Teams

References

External links
 

Living people
1980 births
German female curlers
Curlers at the 2002 Winter Olympics
Olympic curlers of Germany
European curling champions
German curling champions
Sportspeople from Caracas
Venezuelan emigrants to Germany